American Heroes Channel (formerly Military Channel and originally Discovery Wings Channel) is an American multinational pay television channel owned by the Warner Bros. Discovery Networks unit of Warner Bros. Discovery. The network carries programs related to the military, warfare, and military history and science.

As of February 2015, the channel is available to approximately 59,917,000 pay television households (51.5% of households with at least one television set) in the United States.

Background
The channel launched in July 1998, as Discovery Wings Channel; it originally focused on programs relating to aircraft and aerospace. During its early years, the network also aired a weather segment near the top of each hour featuring aviation forecast data from the National Weather Service. Discovery Communications filed a trademark application with the United States Copyright Office for the use of the name "Military Channel" in 2002, after the trademark was abandoned by an unrelated start-up cable network based in Louisville, Kentucky, also named The Military Channel, which went dark in 1999 and later went bankrupt. That network – which focused on the heroes, history and hardware of the international military scene – experienced difficulty raising capital, despite early success.

On January 10, 2005, the network was rebranded as the Military Channel. Carrying over from its original format, many of the network's programs as the Military Channel were dedicated to aerial warfare and related technologies and issues. In 2005, the channel aired its first live program from Philadelphia at the site of the Army–Navy college football game, two hours before that game's kickoff, in which Fox Sports commentator Chris Myers hosted from a set outside of Lincoln Financial Field.

On March 3, 2014, the channel was rebranded as American Heroes Channel, with the intent to "provide more history based, narrative-style documentary programming." The network is a sponsor of the United Service Organizations (USO) and frequently runs commercials for that organization.

Programming
Many of the programs featured on American Heroes Channel are war documentaries, the contents of which deal in large part with modern warfare, and in particular the U.S. military from World War II onward. While the A+E Networks-owned History, Military History and H2 air similar programming, those networks tend to show more programs about other time periods and cultures (ancient, Roman, Medieval, Eastern, and other forms of warfare). AHC has a more contemporary subject matter than those competitors, but it occasionally presents historical programming as well. Actor Dennis Haysbert serves as the network's continuity announcer for its on-air promotions.

In addition, the channel also presents feature films with a military theme (usually within the hosted movie series An Officer and a Movie, which is hosted by Lou Diamond Phillips), as well as individual episodes of other shows (such as Belly of the Beast, Build It Bigger, Extreme Machines, Timewatch and Unsolved History), which incorporate military-related content. These are often shows that were produced for other Discovery Communications-owned channels.

List of programs

Current programs

Against the Odds
America: Facts vs. Fiction
American Lawmen
American Titans
Ancient Assassins
Blood and Fury: America's Civil War
Blood Feuds
Chasing Conspiracies
Codes and Conspiracies
Cold War Armageddon
Egypt's Greatest Mysteries
Forbidden History
Gunslingers
Hitler
How the World Ends
Inside Secret Societies
Mafia's Greatest Hits
Mafia's Most Wanted
Manhunt: Kill or Capture
Nazi Death Squad
Nazi Fugitives
Nazi Secret Files
Origins
UFO's The Lost Evidence
War Stories
What History Forgot
WWII Confidential
WWII: Witness to War

Former programming

9/11 As We Watched
Age of Aerospace
America's Most Badass
The American Revolution
Anatomy Of ...
Apocalypse: Hitler
Apocalypse: Stalin
Apocalypse: WWI
At Sea
Auschwitz: Hitler's Final Solution"BBC AirportBattle of the AtlanticBattleplanBlack OpsClash of WingsThe Color of WarCombat CountdownCombat TechCombat ZoneCommanders at WarEdge of WarEscape to the LegionEvolution of EvilFirepowerFirst CommandThe First World WarFuture WeaponsG.I. FactoryGreatest Tank BattlesGreat PlanesThe Greatest EverHeroes and VillainsHeroes of World War IIHitler's BodyguardHow We Got HereMission DemolitionMissions that Changed the WarModern SniperNarrow Escapes of World War IINatural Born OutlawsNavy SEALs: Untold StoriesNazi CollaboratorsNormandy: The Great CrusadeOfficer and a MovieProject Nazi: The Blueprints of EvilQuest for Sunken WarshipsThe Secret WarSecrets of World War IIShowdown: Air CombatSpecial Ops MissionSpecial Forces: Untold StoriesStealth SecretsSurviving the CutTank OverhaulTop SniperTop TenToughest Military JobsTriggers: Weapons That Changed the World20th Century BattlefieldsUltimate WeaponsWar StoriesWarrior POVWeapon MastersWeaponologyWeaponizersWeapons RacesWeapons of World War IIWings of the LuftwaffeWings Over VietnamWorld at WarWorld's Deadliest AircraftWorld War I in ColourWorld War II In HD ColourWorld War II Confidential''

Some programs are available to stream on Discovery+.

References

External links
 

Warner Bros. Discovery networks
English-language television stations in the United States
Television networks in the United States
Television channels and stations established in 1999
Works about the military
1999 establishments in New Jersey